The Nigerian Export Promotion Council (NEPC) was established through the promulgation of the “Nigerian Export Promotion Council Decree No. 26 of 1976”, now an Act in line with the democratic governance of the Country.

This Act was amended by Decree No. 72 of 1979 and further amended by the Nigerian Export Promotion Decree No. 41 of 1988 and complemented by the Export (Incentives and Miscellaneous Provisions) Decree No. 18 of 1986.

Furthermore, the Nigerian Export Promotion Council (Amendment) Decree No. 64 and 65 of 1992 was promulgated to enhance the performance of the Council.

The Council is the leading Federal Government Agency charged with the responsibility of promoting non-oil export in Nigeria to diversify away from oil and build a formidable economy headquartered in  Abuja, FCT No.40 Blantyre Street, Wuse II.

History
The Nigerian Export Promotion Council] (NEPC) was established through the promulgation of the Nigerian Export Promotion Council Decree No. 26 of 1976 and was formally implemented in March 1977. The act was amended by Decree No. 72 of 1979 and further amended by the Nigerian Export Promotion Council Decree No. 41 of 1988. Appended to the law was the Export (Incentives and Miscellaneous Provisions) Decree No. 18 of 1986, as well as the Nigerian Export Promotion Council Amendment Decree No. 64 of 1992.

The last was authored to enhance the performance of the council by minimizing bureaucratic bottlenecks and increasing autonomy in dealing with members of the organized private sector. The Council has a governing board drawn from both the public and private sectors.

Mission and functions
To spearhead the diversification of the Nigerian economy by expanding and increasing non-oil exports for sustainable and inclusive economic growth.
 To promote the development and diversification of Nigeria's export trade.
 To assist in promoting the development of export-related industries in Nigeria.
 To spearhead the creation of appropriate export incentives and
 To actively articulate and promote the implementation of export policies and programs of the Nigerian Government.
 To co-coordinated monitor export promotion activities in Nigeria.
 To collect and disseminate information on products available for export.
 To collect and disseminate to local manufacturers and exporters information on foreign markets.
 To Provide technical assistance to local exporters in such areas as export procedures and documentation, transportation, financing, marketing techniques, quality control, export packaging, costing and pricing, publicity, and other similar areas.
 To maintain adequate and effective representation in other countries.
 To provide, directly or jointly, with training institutions, training for its staff and assist with the manpower development of the export community in Nigeria.
 To organize and plan the participation of Nigeria in trade fairs and exhibitions.
 To administer grants and other benefits related to export promotion and development.
 To undertake studies of the current economic conditions, with special attention to the export sector to advise the government on necessary policies and measures.
 To establish specific trade promotion facilities in Nigeria and other countries including the establishment of permanent showrooms at important commercial centers in other countries.
 To engage in export promotion publicity
 To pursue the simplification and streamlining of export procedures and documentation on continuously
 To assist in finding appropriate solutions to practical problems encountered by exporters in the process of exportation.
 To plan and organize outward trade missions and provide support from Nigeria.
 To perform such other functions as may be conducive to the achievement of the objective of the Export Decrees.

Structure
The administration of the Council was structured in the following regard: The Board- Consist of the Chairman and ten members. The Council is headed by an Executive Director/CEO while the Departments and Directorates are each headed by a Director/Deputy Director. NEPC Management-Consist of the Executive Director/CEO, while Directors /Deputy Director as Heads of Departments/Directorates. Regional Coordinators are the administrative heads of the Regional Offices of each Geo-political zones in Nigeria.

The Directorates are:
 Special Services Directorate
 Incentives Directorate
 Multilateral and Bilateral Directorate

The Units are:
 Legal Services Unit
 Audit Unit
 Public Relations Unit
 Anti-Corruption and Transparency Unit (ACTU)

The Council has six (6) Regional Offices located at Lagos, Port Harcourt, Kano, Enugu, Jos, Yola.

Current Management
The Executive Director/CEO of The Nigerian Export Promotion Council (NEPC) was Mr. Segun Awolowo from 2013–2017

The Executive Director/CEO of The Nigerian Export Promotion Council (NEPC) is  Dr. Ezra Yakusak 2021–till date.

See also
 Economy of Nigeria
 LADOL - special economic zone

References

Foreign trade of Nigeria
Export promotion agencies